Emanuel Vasconcelos Jardim Fernandes (born 21 January 1944 in Seixal) is a Portuguese politician.

He was a Member of the European Parliament (MEP) from 2004 to 2009 for the Socialist Party; part of the Party of European Socialists.

References

1944 births
Living people
People from Seixal
Socialist Party (Portugal) MEPs
MEPs for Portugal 2004–2009